Carl Seth Green (1 January 1894 – 1 September 1962) was a Swedish equestrian who competed in the 1920 Summer Olympics. He finished 13th in the individual vaulting competition and won a bronze medal with the Swedish vaulting team.

References

1894 births
1962 deaths
Swedish male equestrians
Olympic equestrians of Sweden
Equestrians at the 1920 Summer Olympics
Olympic bronze medalists for Sweden
Olympic medalists in equestrian
Medalists at the 1920 Summer Olympics
People from Flen Municipality
Sportspeople from Södermanland County